Summer Bachelors is a 1926 American silent romantic comedy film produced and directed by Allan Dwan. The film is based on the 1926 novel Summer Widowers, by Warner Fabian and stars Madge Bellamy, Matt Moore, Allan Forrest, and Hale Hamilton.

A copy of Summer Bachelors is preserved at a film archive in Prague.

Plot

Cast
 Madge Bellamy as Derry Thomas
 Allan Forrest as Tony Landor
 Matt Moore as Walter Blakely
 Hale Hamilton as Beverly Greenway
 Leila Hyams as Willowdean French
 Charles Winninger as Preston Smith
 John Holland as Martin Cole
 Olive Tell as Mrs. Preston Smith
 Walter Catlett as Bachelor #1
 James F. Cullen as Bachelor #2
 Cosmo Kyrle Bellew as Bachelor #3
 Charles Esdale as Bachelor #4
Barbara Barondess (uncredited)

Production notes
Interiors shot were filmed at Fox's New York studio, while exteriors were shot on location in Lake Placid, New York.

References

External links

Fox Film Corporation brochure for exhibitors

1926 films
1926 romantic comedy films
Fox Film films
American romantic comedy films
American silent feature films
American black-and-white films
Films based on American novels
Films directed by Allan Dwan
Films shot in New York (state)
Surviving American silent films
1920s American films
Silent romantic comedy films
Silent American comedy films